Shotokan Karate of America (米國松濤館; SKA) is a non-profit organization whose mission is to teach traditional karate-do in the United States.  It was founded by Tsutomu Ohshima, a direct student of Gichin Funakoshi, the father of Shotokan karate.  Ohshima is also recognized as the founder of many other SKA-affiliated Shotokan organizations worldwide.  SKA's national headquarters are located in Los Angeles.

History

Ohshima (1930-) began practicing karate at the Waseda University club in 1948, after having already trained in sumo, kendo, and judo during his childhood.  At the time, Funakoshi, in his early 80s, was still teaching at Waseda and other universities.  Ohshima's leading seniors at Waseda included Hiroshi Noguchi, Shigeru Egami, Toshio Kamata-Watanabe, Tadao Okuyama and Matsuo Shibuya, and he became captain of the club in 1952.  In 1955, he moved to the University of Southern California to continue his studies, and led his first U.S. practice soon afterwards.  In 1957, he started the first university karate club in the United States at Caltech, and in 1959 founded the Southern California Karate Association.  As more dojos were opened in California and throughout the U.S., the organization was renamed to Shotokan Karate of America in 1969. Ohshima officially retired as the shihan (head instructor) of SKA in 2018, at the age of 88. The current SKA shihan is John Teramoto.

Special Training

SKA conducts regional special practices known as "Special Trainings" (or gasshuku in Japanese) twice a year, usually in the winter and summer.  These consist of a series of intense practices held over a short period of time, in a communal setting.  Special Training is considered a crucial aspect of SKA practice, as Ohshima writes, "I hope that all Shotokan members will attend at least one special training because this is the essence of traditional martial arts practice."  One strict rule of Special Training is that no participant may leave until the Special Training is officially over; leaving early without permission of the chief instructor entails automatic expulsion from SKA.

Ranking

SKA uses the ranking system originally introduced by Gichin Funakoshi, with eight kyu ranks, and five dan ranks.  Contrary to many other karate organizations, there are no ranks above godan (5th dan), which Tsutomu Ohshima was awarded by Funakoshi in 1957.  The godan rank is the highest rank ever awarded by Gichin Funakoshi. In SKA it is attainable by talented individuals with several decades of dedicated practice and teaching.

Dojos

SKA maintains a directory of SKA dojos in the United States on its website. Tsutomu Ohshima is also recognized as the chief instructor of several SKA affiliates outside the United States, including:

 Belgium Shotokan
 Canada Shotokan
 Curaçao (as Shotokan Karate of Curaçao)
 France Shotokan
 Gabon
 Germany Shotokan
 Greece Shotokan
 Israel Shotokan
 Japan (as Shotokan Oshima Dojo Japan)
 Morocco
 Spain Shotokan
 Switzerland Shotokan

Additionally, there are SKA-affiliated dojos in Ethiopia, Hong Kong, the Netherlands, Poland and the United Kingdom.

Notes

External links
 ska.org

1955 establishments in California
Karate organizations
Shotokan
Karate in the United States